Henrik Eyser Overgaard-Nielsen (born 2 August 1959) is a British-Danish dentist and politician who served as a Brexit Party Member of the European Parliament (MEP) for the North West of England between 2019 and the United Kingdom's withdrawal from the EU on 31 January 2020.

Early life
Henrik Eyser Overgaard-Nielsen was born in Denmark. His father was a leading campaigner against Denmark joining the European Economic Community, which it did in 1973. He was active in the June Movement and one of the leaders of the successful no-campaign at the Danish referendum on the Maastricht Treaty in 1992. He qualified as a dentist in Copenhagen in 1983.

Dental career
Overgaard-Nielsen is GDP who started NHS Dentist, an NHS dental practice in Fulham, London in 1999. The practice was started with Sharon Bierer, his British-born wife.

In 2013, following a 2012 holiday in the country, Overgaard-Nielsen and Bierer founded a charity, Burmadent, to provide dental services in the Inle Lake area of Myanmar (Burma).

In 2015, Overgaard-Nielsen was elected as the chair of the General Dental Practice Committee (GDPC) of the British Dental Association (BDA), having previously been the vice chair. He was re-elected in January 2019.

Political career
Overgaard-Nielsen has been an active opponent of the EU since the late 1970s, first in the People's Movement against the EU and later in the June Movement. In 1992, Overgaard-Nielsen was co-chairman of the "No" campaign in the Danish referendum on the Maastricht Treaty.

In April 2019, Overgaard-Nielsen was announced as a Brexit Party Member of the European Parliament (MEP) candidate for the North West of England. He subsequently won his seat in the 2019 European Parliament election.

Overgaard-Nielsen considers himself to be a socialist, in 2020 booklet Reclaiming Democracy: The Left Case for Sovereignty that he co-authored with fellow Brexit Party MEP Claire Fox, he said that when he campaigned against the Maastricht Treaty in his native Denmark in 1992, "the 'No' side was dominated by socialists and supported by intellectual and artistic elites", but when he moved to the UK in 1996, he found the Euroscepticism there anchored on the right, while the intelligentsia was mostly pro-EU. He explained his left-wing eurosceptic views by saying that "The EU is rooted in four holy ‘pillars’: unregulated movement of capital, goods, labour and services. The most ardent cheerleaders for these freedoms are large multinational corporations, lobbyists and the middle-class establishment."

Personal life
Overgaard-Nielsen is married to Sharon Bierer, who is British. They have two children, live in London, and own a house near Ostuni, Apulia, Italy. Their daughter, Laura Bierer-Nielsen, is director of policy and research at Labour Leave.

In October 2020, Overgaard-Nielsen became a British citizen.

References

External links 

 Henrik Overgaard-Nielsen on Twitter
 

1959 births
Living people
Brexit Party MEPs
Danish dentists
Danish eurosceptics
British dentists
Danish emigrants to the United Kingdom
MEPs for England 2019–2020
People's Movement against the EU politicians
June Movement politicians
21st-century Danish politicians
21st-century British politicians